Koivula (Finnish; Björkas in Swedish) is a district in the Uittamo-Skanssi ward of the city of Turku, in Finland. It is located in the southeast of the city, and is mainly a low-density residential suburb.

The current population of Koivula is 1,761, and it is decreasing at an annual rate of 0.80%. 16.30% of the district's population are under 15 years old, while 15.67% are over 65. The district's linguistic makeup is 89.10% Finnish, 7.21% Swedish, and 3.69% other.

See also
 Districts of Turku
 Districts of Turku by population
 Koivula (surname)

Districts of Turku